Viktoriya Beloslydtseva (born 9 January 1972) is an athlete from Kazakhstan.  She competes in archery.

Beloslydtseva represented Kazakhstan at the 2004 Summer Olympics.  She placed 26th in the women's individual ranking round with a 72-arrow score of 629.  In the first round of elimination, she faced 39th-ranked Deonne Bridger of Australia.  Beloslydtseva defeated Bridger, winning 150-145 in the 18-arrow match to advance to the round of 32.  In that round, she faced Justyna Mospinek of Poland, losing to the 7th-ranked archer 163-155 in the regulation 18 arrows.  Beloslydtseva finished 23rd in women's individual archery.

She competed at the 1998 Asian Games where she won a bronze medal in the team event.

She now owns and manages an archery school near Pattaya, Thailand. (As of 2o12)

References

1972 births
Living people
Archers at the 2004 Summer Olympics
Kazakhstani female archers
Olympic archers of Kazakhstan
Asian Games medalists in archery
Archers at the 1998 Asian Games
Archers at the 2006 Asian Games
Asian Games bronze medalists for Kazakhstan
Medalists at the 1998 Asian Games
21st-century Kazakhstani women